Divya Mehra (born 1981) is a Canadian artist from Winnipeg, Manitoba. Mehra's work deals with her diasporic experiences and historical narratives. As reminders of the realities of displacement, loss, and oppression, she incorporates found artifacts and readymade objects.

Early life and education 
Mehra was born Winnipeg, Canada, the second youngest of four children. She received her BFA (Honors) in Visual Arts from the University of Manitoba School of Art in Winnipeg in 2005 and her MFA in Visual Arts from Columbia University School of the Arts in New York City in 2008.

Work 

Mehra works in a multitude of forms, including sculpture, print, drawing, artist books, installation, advertising, performance, video and film. She often uses humour as an entry to her work, explaining, "Humour everyone can understand ... creates space because it's really the most accessible thing and so that becomes the pathway into my work." Mehra encourages viewers to consider their reactions to difficult questions about race(ism) and representation. She asks, "How can I have a conversation about something as complex as race and representation? If you...joke about it, I think it creates a space for a lot of people to enter and then think about what they're laughing at." By pairing research and popular culture — including comics and social media — with her experience as an artist within the Indian diaspora, she creates provocative yet humorous works that disarm viewers while challenging stereotypes and contributing to conversations about the impacts of racism. Mehra's artistic output is a form of resistance — both to being consumed by and to satisfying the audience's needs and desires.

Mehra is known in part for her text-based works. One of her first of such works, Currently Fashionable, was created in 2009 and shown as a part of her exhibition, You have to tell Them, i'm not a Racist first presented in 2012 at La Maison des artistes visuels francophones, in St. Boniface, Manitoba, and again in 2017 at Georgia Scherman Projects in Toronto. The text works appear in English, Hindi and French.  In her 2017 exhibition essay "Abolish, She Said", Kendra Place sums up Mehra's institutional critique: "Personnel changes are necessary and urgent. Where inclusion is suspect, however, Divya is holding out for something more substantial than what can sometimes be tokenizing diversity or spectacular multiculturalism, such that white people are no longer the hegemonic curatorial, editorial, and directorial influence, and people of colour are not reduced to a fleeting trend".

Selected projects 

In 2012 Mehra was one of ten artists commissioned by MTV, MoMA PS1, and Creative Time to reimagine "Art Breaks" — a video series on MTV in the 1980s that first showcased video work by Keith Haring, Jean-Michel Basquiat and Andy Warhol. Art Breaks 2012 featured videos by Sema Bekirovic, Cody Critcheloe, Andrew Kuo, Mads Lynnerup, Tala Madani, Mehra, Rashaad Newsome, Jani Ruscica, Mickalene Thomas, and Guido van der Werve. In Mehra's contribution to the series, entitled On Tragedy: Did you hear the one about the Indian?, she "riffs on [Richard] Prince’s 1985 video, in which he buys a vanilla cone from an ice cream truck outside the Guggenheim Museum and proclaims himself ‘one of the best-kept secrets in the art world’." It is modeled in the same way as the Prince work; the audience watches Mehra pay and wait for a soft ice cream cone she has ordered from an ice cream vendor parked outside the Guggenheim. "When she finally gets it, the swirled ice cream is stacked so high that even before she utters a single word, it topples to the sidewalk with an evocative splat. It's almost slapstick."

Mehra was shortlisted for the Sobey Art Award in 2017. Mehra created new work for both the exhibition and her Sobey Art Award profile video, which functioned as a visual montage of her phone's personal archive. In her collection of five works for the exhibition, Mehra explores racism, loss and identity. The National Gallery of Canada writes: "Symbolizing the failure of the American dream, a crushed gold vintage Jaguar dominates her section of the exhibition. The car is joined by personal objects like the brass base of a statue of the deity Ganesh. The rest of the statue was sawed from the base and stolen from her family's restaurant."

In 2018, Mehra was commissioned to create the Spring 2018 Canadian Art Magazine cover for the "Dirty Words" issue. For the cover image she recreated the set of the popular Canadian sketch comedy show, You Can't Do That On Television, and reimagined one of the infamous recurring moments when a character on set is being drenched with slime whenever they say "I don't know." In her recreation, Mehra "rebels, shielding herself from the slime — dumped on her by white, male arms — with an umbrella. There is a stoic, ironic expression on her face." That same issue also features an artist folio by her — entitled "Tone" — that explores the complexity of South Asian diasporic experiences.

Mehra was also the subject of a 2018 episode of the CBC Arts docu-series, In The Making. The series "is an immersive journey inside the creative process" that "follows host Sean O'Neill across the country and around the world alongside some of Canada's leading artists as they bring new work to life and face pivotal moments of risk and reward." In the series finale, Mehra travels to India to begin work on a new inflatable work — a bouncy castle Taj Mahal — that was then exhibited for the first time as a special project for Vision Exchange: Perspectives From India to Canada, which began its cross-Canada tour in September 2018. "Mehra’s installation utilizes the Taj Mahal as a point of departure, considering how it has become an overused and problematic cultural signifier representing South Asian people throughout the diaspora." The National Gallery of Canada acquired the work.

Selected exhibitions 

Banff Centre,
Art Gallery of Ontario, 
Morris and Helen Belkin Art Gallery at the University of British Columbia 
Artspeak,

Selected awards 
 Manitoba Arts Council, Major Arts Grant, 2014
 Glenfiddich Art Award, shortlist, 2015
Sobey Art Award, shortlist, Prairies and the North region, 2017
Wanda Koop Research Fund, 2020
Sobey Art Award, winner, 2022.

Publications 
 Mehra. '"Tone". Canadian Art Magazine, 2018.
 Mehra. Pouring Water on a Drowning Man. Winnipeg: As We Try and Sleep Press, 2014.
 Mehra. Quit, India. Vancouver: Artspeak & Winnipeg: Platform Gallery, 2013.

Selected Reviews & Interviews 

 Jen Zoratti. “Artist tackles colonialism with wit, Inflatable installation acquired by National Gallery of Canada,” Winnipeg Free Press, August 31, 2019.
 Yaniya Lee. "Tactics and Strategies of Racialized Artists: Some Notes on How to Circumvent the Art World’s Terms of Inclusion," ArtsEverywhere/Musagetes, November 29, 2018.
 Marissa Largo. “Jamelie Hassan and Divya Mehra: Cultural Currency and Canada 150,” Asian Diasporic Visual Cultures and the Americas, Issue 4, March 4, 2018. 
 Mark Mann. “White Like Me: Encountering Divya Mehra’s You have to tell Them, i’m not a Racist.,” Momus, October 21, 2017.
 Amy Fung. “Dearest Divya,” in conjunction with the exhibition You have to tell Them, i’m not a Racist., Georgia Scherman Projects, Toronto, 2017.
 Kendra Place. “Abolish, She Said,” in conjunction with the exhibition You have to tell Them, i’m not a Racist., Georgia Scherman Projects, Toronto, 2017.
 Angela Henderson & Solomon Nagler. “Review: It’s Gonna Rain,” Border Crossings Magazine, Issue 141, March 2017.
 Denise Markonish. “Oh, Canada: Contemporary Art from North North America,” in conjunction with the exhibition, Oh, Canada, at MASS MoCA, Cambridge, MA: MIT Press, 2012.

References

External links 
 Official website
 Divya Mehra on Vimeo

Living people
20th-century Canadian artists
Canadian contemporary artists
Canadian people of Indian descent
Columbia University School of the Arts alumni
1981 births
20th-century Canadian women artists
21st-century Canadian women artists